Marine Medium Tiltrotor Squadron 266 (VMM-266) is a United States Marine Corps tiltrotor squadron consisting of MV-22 Osprey transport aircraft. The squadron, known as the "Fighting Griffins", is based at Marine Corps Air Station New River, North Carolina falls under the command of Marine Aircraft Group 26 (MAG-26) and the 2nd Marine Aircraft Wing (2nd MAW).

Mission
Support the Marine Air Ground Task Force (MAGTF) commander by providing tactical mobility and logistical support for the MAGTF, day or night, in all weather conditions. VMM-266 does this by conducting mission essential tasks, which include shipboard operations, sea and air deployment operations, air assault, amphibious assaults and raids, distribution of supplies and other transport services, joint personnel recovery, and conduct of noncombatant evacuation.

History

The Early years
HMM-266 was activated on April 26, 1983 at Marine Corps Air Station (MCAS) New River, North Carolina. In its first year, the squadron established a foundation that would make it the cold weather assault support experts for 2nd MAW. Over the course of the next six years, the squadron participated in fourteen exercises from the High Sierras of the Mountain Warfare Training Center (MWTC) in Bridgeport, California to the arctic climes of northern Norway.

The Gulf War and the 1990s
Following the invasion of Kuwait in August 1990, HMM-266 initially provided aircraft and personnel to other MAG-26 squadrons as they prepared for deployment.  On December 31, 1990, HMM-266 became the first CH-46E squadron from II Marine Expeditionary Force (II MEF) to deploy to Southwest Asia (SWA).  On January 4, 1991, the squadron arrived in Jubail, Saudi Arabia, and provided assault support in the form of Tactical Recovery of Aircraft and Personnel (TRAP), troop movement, casualty evacuation (CASEVAC), and re-supply missions. The squadron moved to Combat Outpost Lonesome Dove with the rest of MAG-26 for Operation Desert Storm and conducted combat support from this location until offensive operations ceased on February 28, 1991. In May, the Fighting Griffins were the last MAG-26 squadron to return to MCAS New River.

In 1992, while off the coast off Italy, the CH-46s of HMM-266 (Rein) made worldwide news. They provided heavy lift support when Mount Etna erupted and lava flow threatened to wipe out the town of Zafferana, Sicily.

In February - March 1994, the squadron supported Operation Continue Hope and Operation Quick Draw in Somalia. After successfully completing these operations, the Fighting Griffins proceeded to the Adriatic Sea in support of Operation Provide Promise and Operation Deny Flight. HMM-266 (Rein) returned to MCAS New River on 23 June, and ten days later was recalled to deploy to the Caribbean in support of Operation Support Democracy in Haiti.

The squadron deployed in November 1998 and immediately detached three CH-46Es and its two UH-1Ns to conduct contingency operations off the coast of Albania concurrent with Operation Silver Knight.

In March 1999, the Fighting Griffins were designated the TRAP stand-by force in support of Operation Allied Force and Joint Task Force (JTF) Noble Anvil strike missions into Serbia. Upon arriving on station, the Combined Air Operations Center (CAOC) assigned the aviation combat element (ACE) AV-8Bs six excess combat strike sorties per day. The AV-8Bs flew their first combat sortie on April 14 with strike missions into Kosovo. A total of thirty four combat sorties and 65.3 combat hours were flown in support of Operation Allied Force/JTF Noble Anvil. In addition to AV-8B strike missions, two CH-46Es successfully extracted a Navy Special Warfare Team Personal Security Force from Petrovic, Macedonia.

Global War on Terror

They passed through the Suez Canal and debarked in April to establish a base of operations in Kandahar, Afghanistan to participate in Operation Asbury Park. Operation Asbury Park was extended one month, and HMM-266 (Rein) ceased combat operations on July 10, returning home on September 16, 2004.

On August 7, 2005, the Fighting Griffins deployed to Al Asad, Iraq to support Operation Iraqi Freedom. The Fighting Griffins assumed the mission of medium lift assault support from HMM-264 at 0700HRS on August 20, 2005.

 
The squadron stood down as Marine Medium Helicopter 266 on June 15, 2006, as a CH-46E squadron and stood up as Marine Medium Tiltrotor Squadron 266 (VMM-266) on March 23, 2007. After VMM-263 and VMM-162, VMM-266 became the third operational Osprey unit of the Marine Corps. In September 2008, the squadron again deployed to Al Asad Airbase to support OIF.

2020’s
In late 2020, VMM-266 deployed to Spain in support of the North African Response Force, or NARF.

See also

 United States Marine Corps Aviation
 Organization of the United States Marine Corps
 List of United States Marine Corps aircraft squadrons

References
Notes

Bibliography

External links
 

VMM266